Bubo osvaldoi, also known as the Cuban horned owl, is an extinct species of horned owl from Pleistocene of Cuba.

It was described by Oscar Arredondo and Storrs L. Olson in 1994 from three bones found in a cave in the Guaniguanico mountain range in Pinar del Río. Analysis of these indicates that the species was larger than any current owl.

References

Pleistocene birds
Bubo (genus)
Fossil taxa described in 1994